Seepa may refer to:

Sipa (disambiguation)
CIPA (disambiguation)